Strong is a township in the Canadian province of Ontario, as well as the name of a community within the township. Located in the Almaguin Highlands region of Parry Sound District, the township surrounds but does not include the village of Sundridge.

The township includes the communities of Hartfell, Kennedys, Lake Bernard, Pevensey, Stirling Falls and Strong. It surrounds Lake Bernard, which is claimed to be the world's largest freshwater lake without an island.

Demographics 

Mother tongue:
 English as first language: 95.1%
 French as first language: 1.5%
 English and French as first language: 0%
 Other as first language: 3.4%

See also
List of townships in Ontario

References

External links

Municipalities in Parry Sound District
Single-tier municipalities in Ontario
Township municipalities in Ontario